State Highway 224 (SH 224) is a Texas state highway running from Greenville northeast to Commerce. The route was designated in 1979 as a renumbering of a portion of its parent SH 24 when it was rerouted southward from Commerce along SH 50.

History

Previous route
On October 22, 1935, SH 224 was designated as a route from SH 6 to the A&M University Administration Building via New Main Drive. This route was canceled on September 26, 1939, and it was redesignated on January 27, 1940, as Spur 86 (erroneously omitted from the renumbering). Spur 86 was canceled on January 30, 1951.

Current route
The current version of SH 224 was designated on May 21, 1979, assuming the former routing of SH 24 when that highway was realigned onto SH 50. On February 22, 2001, the western end of SH 224 was truncated to SH 34. At that time, the concurrency between SH 224 and SH 34 was eliminated and the portion of SH 224 between SH 34 and US 69 was redesignated as Spur 302.

Business routes
SH 224 has one business route.

Commerce business loop

Business State Highway 224-B (Bus. SH 224-B) is a business loop that runs on the former routing of SH 224 through Commerce. The route was created on April 27, 2000, replacing Business SH 24-B.

Junction list

References

224
Transportation in Hunt County, Texas